A vingtaine (literally "group of twenty" in French) is a political subdivision of Jersey. They are subdivisions of the various parishes of Jersey, and one, La Vingtaine de la Ville (The Vingtaine of the town), in Saint Helier is further divided into two cantons.

St. Ouen has cueillettes (Jèrriais: Tchilliettes) instead of vingtaines.

In each vingtaine, vingteniers and Constable's officers (in French: officiers du Connétable) are elected as part of Jersey's Honorary Police system. They do not have to live within the vingtaine or cueillette they represent, but they must live in the parish they represent (except in St. Helier, where ratepayers and mandataires are eligible).

Vingteniers are elected by a Parish Assembly of electors and ratepayers for a term of three years but are elected to a particular vingtaine (or cueillette) in that Parish.  Vingteniers carry out general community policing in the parish, and fulfill administrative roles within their vingtaine in respect of tasks such as the Visite du Branchage.

Constable's Officers are elected to serve a vingtaine or cueillette at an Assembly of the electors of that Parish. They assist the Centeniers and vingteniers of the parish with community policing.

Roads Inspectors are elected to serve a vingtaine or cueillette at an Assembly of the electors of the Parish. They are responsible to for maintaining the highways and byways of the Vingtaine. Along with Honorary Police they are sworn in as officers by the Royal Court. Roads Inspectors report to and must enforce the decisions of the Roads Committee of the Parish.

By parish, the vingtaines are as follows-

Grouville
La Vingtaine des Marais 
La Vingtaine de la Rue
La Vingtaine de Longueville
La Vingtaine de la Rocque (includes the uninhabited Minquiers)

Saint Brélade
 La Vingtaine de Noirmont
 La Vingtaine du Coin
 La Vingtaine des Quennevais
 La Vingtaine de la Moye

St Clement
La Grande Vingtaine 
La Vingtaine du Rocquier 
La Vingtaine de Samarès (includes La Motte Island)

St Helier
 La Vingtaine de la Ville
 Canton de Bas de la Vingtaine de la Ville
 Canton de Haut de la Vingtaine de la Ville
 La Vingtaine du Rouge Bouillon
 La Vingtaine de Bas du Mont au Prêtre
 La Vingtaine de Haut du Mont au Prêtre
 La Vingtaine du Mont à l'Abbé
 La Vingtaine du Mont Cochon

St John
La Vingtaine du Nord 
La Vingtaine de Hérupe 
La Vingtaine du Douet

St Lawrence
La Vingtaine de la Vallée
La Vingtaine du Coin Hâtain 
La Vingtaine du Coin Motier 
La Vingtaine du Coin Tourgis Nord 
La Vingtaine du Coin Tourgis Sud

St Martin
La Vingtaine de Rozel
La Vingtaine de Faldouet
La Vingtaine de la Quéruée
La Vingtaine de l'Église
La Vingtaine du Fief de la Reine

The Écréhous (including Les Dirouilles and Pierres de Lecq) are part of the parish of St. Martin, but are uninhabited.

St Mary
La Vingtaine du Sud 
La Vingtaine du Nord

St Ouen
Unusually, the subdivisions of this parish are not named vingtaines, they are instead named cueillettes.

La Petite Cueillette 
La Grande Cueillette 
La Cueillette de Grantez 
La Cueillette de Millais 
La Cueillette de Vinchelez 
La Cueillette de Léoville

St Peter
La Vingtaine du Douet 
La Vingtaine de St. Nicolas 
La Grande Vingtaine 
La Vingtaine des Augerez 
La Vingtaine du Coin Varin

St Saviour
La Vingtaine de Maufant 
La Vingtaine de Sous la Hougue 
La Vingtaine des Pigneaux
La Vingtaine de la Grande Longueville 
La Vingtaine de la Petite Longueville 
La Vingtaine de Sous l'Église

Trinity
La Vingtaine de la Ville-à-l'Évêque
La Vingtaine de Rozel
La Vingtaine du Rondin
La Vingtaine des Augrès
La Vingtaine de la Croiserie

References

 
Types of administrative division
Administrative divisions in Europe